Rohrbach or Röhrbach may refer to:

Places

Municipalities in Switzerland
Rohrbach, Switzerland, in the canton of Bern

Municipalities in Germany
Rohrbach, Bavaria, in the district of Pfaffenhofen, Bavaria
Rohrbach, Birkenfeld, in the district of Birkenfeld, Rhineland-Palatinate
Rohrbach, Rhein-Hunsrück, in the district of Rhein-Hunsrück, Rhineland-Palatinate
Rohrbach, Palatinate, in the district Südliche Weinstraße, Rhineland-Palatinate
Rohrbach, Saalfeld-Rudolstadt, in the district of Saalfeld-Rudolstadt, Thuringia
Rohrbach, Weimarer Land, in the district Weimarer Land, Thuringia
Rohrbach am Gießhübel, in the district of Heilbronn in Baden-Württemberg
, a district of the city of Heidelberg, Baden-Württemberg

Municipalities in France
Rohrbach-lès-Bitche in Moselle
Rorbach-lès-Dieuze in Moselle
Saint-Jean-Rohrbach in Moselle

Districts and municipalities in Austria
Rohrbach District, in Upper Austria
Berg bei Rohrbach, a former township in Rohrbach District, since 2015 part of Rohrbach-Berg
Rohrbach-Berg, capital of Rohrbach District
Rohrbach in Oberösterreich, former capital of Rohrbach District, since 2015 part of Rohrbach-Berg
Rohrbach an der Gölsen, in Lower Austria
Rohrbach an der Lafnitz, in Styria
Rohrbach bei Mattersburg, in Burgenland
Rohrbach-Steinberg, former municipality, Styria

Municipalities in the Czech Republic
Hrušovany u Brna (Rohrbach was German name), village in South Moravia

Village in Luxembourg
Lasauvage, in the commune of Differdange (Rohrbach was German name, now seldom-used)

Rivers of Germany
Rohrbach (Fulda), Hesse, tributary of the Fulda
Rohrbach (Osterbach), Hesse, tributary of the Osterbach
Rohrbach (Saar), Saarland, tributary of the Saar
Röhrbach, North Rhine-Westphalia
Rohrbach (Tauber), Bavaria and Baden-Württemberg, tributary of the Tauber
Rohrbach (Felchbach), Bavaria, tributary of the Felchbach

People with the surname
John F. D. Rohrbach (1889–1968), American business executive
Kelly Rohrbach (born 1990), American model and actress
Hans Rohrbach (1903–1993), German mathematician and cryptanalyst
Marcel Rohrbach (1933–2012), French racing cyclist
Larry Rohrbach, American politician
Paul Rohrbach (1869–1956), German writer
Paul Rohrbach (botanist) (1846–1871), German botanist
Sebastian Rohrbach (born  1975), German actor
Thomas Rohrbach (born 1949), retired footballer
Wenno von Rohrbach, first Master (Herrmeister) of the Livonian Brothers of the Sword, leading the Order from 1204 to 1209

Other
Rohrbach Metall-Flugzeugbau, former aircraft company
Rohrbach Brewing Company,  brewery in Rochester, New York, USA

German-language surnames